Bhanwar (Whirlpool) is a  television docudrama series based on judgments from the Indian judicial system. The series was produced by TV18 and was originally telecast on Sony Entertainment Television in 1998 -2015.

Bhanwar which aired in the late 1990s on Sony TV was a one-of-a-kind show which dealt with landmark judgements from the Indian judicial system. Produced by TV18, the series ran for two years on Sony TV. It was directed by Sanjay Ray Chaudhari and written by Sanjeev Sharma and Sanjay Chauhan. The show was so popular, it was re-aired on SAB TV and Fox History. It received the Special Jury Award for Best Investigative Show at the 1998 Screen Awards.

Second Season
In 2015 the show returned to Sony TV with brand new judicial cases. It was produced by Siddharth Malhotra, Cinevistaas Ltd. and Contiloe Entertainment. The show premiered on 10 January 2015.

Episodic Appearances
 Amit Tandon as Advocate Rohit Rajput
 Pooja Sharma as Surbhi
 Manish Naggdev as Mahesh Mallik
 Surendra Pal
 Tapasya Nayak Srivastava
 Rajsingh Verma
 Tarun Khanna
 Tunisha Sharma
 Faisal Khan
 Jiten Lalwani
 Tanvi Thakkar
 Vineet Raina
 Parul Chaudhary
 Yashashri Masurkar
 Ankit Gera
 Ankita Bhargava
 Akhil Mishra as Ahmed
 Ribbhu Mehra as Magician
 Tiya Gandwani as Nidhi Taneja (Episode 2)
 Arun Bali as Shankar Lal (Season 1)
 Rajat Kapoor (Season 1)
 Vijay Raaz (Season 1)
 Irrfan Khan as keval Krishna Gupta (Lawyer) Season-1
 Gajraj Rao Season-1
 Kay Kay Menon Season-1

See also
 Geeta and Sanjay Chopra kidnapping case

References

Sony Entertainment Television original programming
1998 Indian television series debuts
Indian crime television series
Indian drama television series
2015 Indian television series endings
Courtroom drama television series
Television courtroom dramas